The 1939 Duquesne Dukes football team represented Duquesne University in the 1939 college football season. The Dukes were led by first-year head coach Aldo Donelli. For the second time in four years, the Dukes upset cross-town rivals Pittsburgh, this time as the Panthers were the number one team in the US. The Dukes finished undefeated, with a record of 8–0–1, and ranked 10th in the AP Poll.

Schedule

References

Duquesne
Duquesne Dukes football seasons
College football undefeated seasons
Duquesne Dukes football